The 5th District of Columbia Infantry Battalion was an infantry battalion that served in the Union Army between April and July, 1861, during the American Civil War.

Service 
The battalion was organized at Washington, D.C. Its purpose, until June, was the defence of Washington. In June, the regiment formed part of an expedition to Rockville, Maryland, passing through Seneca Mills (on June 10) and reaching Great Falls on July 7. They were then mustered out during July, 1861.

See also

List of District of Columbia Civil War regiments

References

Bibliography 
 Dyer, Frederick H. A Compendium of the War of the Rebellion. New York and London. Thomas Yoseloff, Publisher, 1959. .

Units and formations of the Union Army from the District of Columbia
1861 establishments in Washington, D.C.
Military units and formations established in 1861
Military units and formations disestablished in 1861